The 103rd Infantry Division ("Cactus Division") was a unit of the United States Army that served in the U.S. Seventh Army of the 6th Army Group during World War II.

It was variously assigned to the VI Corps, XV Corps, and XXI Corps. By war's end it was part of VI Corps' dash across Bavaria into the Alps, reaching Innsbruck, Austria, taking the Brenner Pass, and earning the honor of linking up with the U.S. Fifth Army coming north from Vipiteno, Italy, joining the Italian and Western European fronts on 4 May 1945.

Interwar period

The division was constituted in the Organized Reserve on 24 June 1921 and assigned to the states of Colorado, Arizona, and New Mexico. The headquarters was organized on 31 August 1921 at the Colorado State Capitol in Denver, Colorado, and was moved on 29 March 1922 to the Kittredge Building in Denver and remained there until the division was ordered into active military service for World War II.

World War II

Campaigns: Ardennes-Alsace, Rhineland, Central Europe
Awards: Distinguished Service Cross (United States)-12; Distinguished Service Medal (United States)-1; Silver Star-299; LM-3; SM-14; BSM-2,669; AM-92
Commanders: Maj. Gen. Charles C. Haffner Jr. (November 1942 – January 1945), Maj. Gen. Anthony C. McAuliffe (January–July 1945), Brig. Gen. John N. Robinson (August 1945 to inactivation).

Combat chronicle
The 103rd Infantry Division was ordered into active military service on 15 November 1942 at Camp Claiborne, Louisiana. The officer and enlisted cadre came from the 85th Infantry Division at Camp Shelby, Mississippi, and the enlisted fillers arrived from reception centers located across nearly the entire country, comprising installations in the 4th, 6th, 7th, 8th, and 9th Service Commands (Camp Grant, Illinois, 4,060; Fort Custer, Michigan, 3,845; Fort Leavenworth, Kansas, 1,307; Camp Dodge, Iowa, 1,036; Fort Snelling, Minnesota, 990; Eighth and Ninth Service Command reception centers, 921; Fort Bragg, North Carolina, 600; Fort Oglethorpe, Georgia, 600; Fort McPherson, Georgia, 537; Jefferson Barracks, Missouri, 526; Fort Jackson, South Carolina, 218). 

After nearly two years of training, the 103rd departed the United States for Europe on 5 October 1944. The division arrived at Marseilles, France, 20 October 1944. It relieved the 3d Division at Chevry on 8 November, arrived at Docelles (Vosges) on 9 November, and attacked west of St. Dié, 16 November, in its drive through the Vosges. Meeting heavy resistance all the way, it crossed the Meurthe River, took St. Dié on 23 November and captured Diefenbach on 29 November and Selestat on 4 December.

The division crossed the Zintzel river at Griesbach, 10 December 1944. Pushing through Climbach, the 103rd crossed the Lauter River into Germany, 15 December, and assaulted the outer defenses of the Siegfried Line. On 22 December, the division moved west to the Sarreguemines area where an active defense was maintained. The enemy offensive did not develop in its sector and the 103rd moved to Reichshofen, 14 January 1945, to take up positions along the Sauer River. On 15 January, General Anthony "Nuts" McAuliffe was redeployed from the Battle of the Bulge and given command, which he retained until July 1945. Defensive patrols were active and a limited attack on Soufflenheim on 19 January was repulsed by the enemy. On 20 January, the division withdrew to the Moder and repulsed German advances near Muehlhausen, 23–25 January. The 103rd's offensive began on 15 March 1945. Crossing the Moder and Zintzel rivers and taking Muehlhausen against sharp opposition, the division moved over the Lauter river and penetrated the defenses of the Siegfried Line.

As German resistance disintegrated, the 103rd reached the Upper Rhine Valley, 23 March, and engaged in mopping up operations in the plain west of the River Rhine. In April 1945, it received occupational duties until 20 April when it resumed the offensive, pursuing a fleeing enemy through Stuttgart and taking Münsingen on 24 April. On 27 April, elements of the division entered Landsberg, where Kaufering concentration camp, a subcamp of Dachau, was liberated. The men of the division crossed the Danube River near Ulm on 26 April. On 3 May 1945, members of its 409th Infantry Regiment captured Innsbruck, Austria with little to no fighting. The 411th Infantry Regiment continued on to take the Brenner Pass and earn the honor of linking up with the 88th Infantry Division of the Fifth Army, which had been fighting its way north up the Italian peninsula. Troops met at Vipiteno, Italy, near the Austrian border, on 4 May 1945, joining the Italian and Western European fronts.

After Victory in Europe Day, the division received occupational duties until it left for home and inactivation. It returned to the continental U.S. on 10 September 1945, and was inactivated on 22 September 1945 at Camp Kilmer, New Jersey.

Casualties

Total battle casualties: 4,558
Killed in action: 720
Wounded in action: 3,329
Missing in action: 88
Prisoner of war: 421

Order of battle
Components of the 103rd Infantry Division included:

 Headquarters, 103rd Infantry Division
 409th Infantry Regiment
 410th Infantry Regiment
 411th Infantry Regiment
 Headquarters and Headquarters Battery, 103rd Infantry Division Artillery
 382nd Field Artillery Battalion (105 mm)
 383rd Field Artillery Battalion (105 mm)
 384th Field Artillery Battalion (155 mm)
 928th Field Artillery Battalion (105 mm)
 328th Engineer Combat Battalion
 328th Medical Battalion
 103rd Cavalry Reconnaissance Troop (Mechanized)
 Headquarters, Special Troops, 103rd Infantry Division
 Headquarters Company, 103rd Infantry Division
 803rd Ordnance Light Maintenance Company
 103rd Quartermaster Company
 103rd Signal Company
 Military Police Platoon
 Band
 103rd Counterintelligence Corps Detachment

Assignments in the European Theater of Operations
1 November 1944: United States Seventh Army, 6th Army Group
6 November 1944: VI Corps, Seventh Army
22 December 1944: XV Corps, Seventh Army
9 January 1945: XXI Corps, Seventh Army
16 January 1945: VI Corps, Seventh Army
29 March 1945: Seventh Army, 6th Army Group
19 April 1945: VI Corps, Seventh Army

Attached units 
The following units, or their constituents, were attached for a time to the 103rd Infantry Division during its career:

Antiaircraft Artillery 

 353d Anti-Aircraft Artillery Battalion
 354th Anti-Aircraft Artillery Battalion

Armored 

 43rd Tank Battalion
 47th Tank Battalion
 48th Tank Battalion
 191st Tank Battalion
 756th Tank Battalion
 761st Tank Battalion
 781st Tank Battalion

Field Artillery 

 69th Armored Field Artillery Battalion
 242nd Field Artillery Battalion

Tank Destroyer 

 601st Tank Destroyer Battalion

 614th Tank Destroyer Battalion
 824th Tank Destroyer Battalion

Post war

The 103rd was activated as an Organized Reserve Corps division on 7 May 1947 in Des Moines, Iowa. Its combat elements were reorganized and redesignated as the 205th Infantry Brigade and the 103rd Operational Headquarters in February 1963. The 103rd Operational Headquarters was redesignated as the 103rd Command Headquarters (Divisional) in June 1963. In December 1965, the unit was reorganized as the 103rd Support Brigade.

In September 1977, the unit was redesignated and reorganized as the 103rd Corps Support Command (COSCOM), the first Corps Support Command in the United States Army Reserve. On 15 September 1993, the 103rd COSCOM inactivated, followed by the creation of two new reserve units: 19th Theater Army Area Command (CONUS) and 3d COSCOM (CONUS). On 14 February 2006, the 103rd was redesignated as Headquarters and Headquarters Company, 103rd Sustainment Command. The 103rd Expeditionary Sustainment Command was activated as a reserve command, effective 16 September 2006. The division shoulder patch is worn by the United States Army Reserve 103rd Sustainment Command (Expeditionary).

References

External links
 https://web.archive.org/web/20031002001003/http://nuspel.org/reminiscences.pdf
 103d Infantry Division Collection, Special Collections at The University of Southern Mississippi.

103d Infantry Division, U.S.
Infantry Division, U.S. 103d
Military units and formations established in 1921
Military units and formations disestablished in 1945
1921 establishments in the United States
Infantry divisions of the United States Army in World War II